Lukas Wilaschek (born April 30, 1981 in Katowice, Upper Silesia, Poland) is a German boxer who won several medals at major events as an amateur. He is now a professional boxer and an undefeated fringe contender.

Amateur career
2002 he lost the Euro junior middleweight final to Russian Andrey Mishin, in 2004 he competed at middleweight and lost again to a Russian in Gaydarbek Gaydarbekov.

At the 2004 Olympics he lost early to Oleg Mashkin.

Professional career
The lanky counterpuncher turned pro in 2004 and won 20 bouts against nondescript opposition displaying only moderate power.

External links
2002 Euro
2004 Euro

1981 births
Living people
Sportspeople from Katowice
Polish emigrants to Germany
Olympic boxers of Germany
Middleweight boxers
Boxers at the 2004 Summer Olympics
German male boxers